Jamal Jumá, born in Baghdad, is an Iraqi poet and writer. Since 1984, he has lived in Denmark. He has Bachelor of Arts in Arabic literature from University of Basrah and Cand.mag. in Semitic Philology from the University of Copenhagen. He was an Arabic literature lecturer at the Center of Oriental Studies at the University of Vilnius.

Life and career

He has published several collections of poetry, including Book of the Book (1990), A Handshake in the Dark (1995), and Diary of the Sleepwalker (1998). His work has been translated to several languages.

He has also edited and published numerous manuscripts of Erotica, including The Perfumed Garden, A Promenade of the Hearts, and The Forbidden Texts. This infuriated some religious and political establishments around the Arab World, resulting in the confiscation and banning of these books in all Arab countries. Besides he has translated several works by Danish poets and authors into Arabic, among them Jens Fink-Jensen, Bo Green Jensen, Johannes V. Jensen, Janus Kodal and Niels Lyngsø.

Jamal Jumá achieved his first and major cultural breakthrough internationally when famous British composer Michael Nyman set to music a good number of poems from his collection A Handshake in the Dark.  The choral work was commissioned by the BBC and premiered by the BBC Symphony Chorus and BBC Symphony Orchestra on 8 March 2007 at the Barbican Hall, London, with John Storgards as conductor.

Books and anthologies 
Book of the Book
Iraqi Poetry Today

Articles 
Rafed Khashan: Diary of Sleepwalker
Nahrain Al-Mousawi: Iraqi Memory in Three Poems
The Sunday Times: How a family trauma inspired an Iraqi poet
Michael Nyman: A Handshake in the Dark
Amir Taheri: An Iraqi Poet Finds a New Language, Amir Taheri

See also

 Iraqi art
 List of Iraqi artists

References 

Living people
20th-century Iraqi poets
Writers from Baghdad
Iraqi expatriates in Denmark
University of Basrah alumni
Year of birth missing (living people)
21st-century Iraqi poets